Acmocera is a genus of longhorn beetles of the subfamily Lamiinae.

 Acmocera compressa (Fabricius, 1801)
 Acmocera conjux Thomson, 1858
 Acmocera flavoguttata Breuning, 1935
 Acmocera inermis Thomson, 1858
 Acmocera insularis Breuning, 1940
 Acmocera joveri Lepesme & Breuning, 1952
 Acmocera lutosa Jordan, 1903
 Acmocera olympiana Thomson, 1858

References

Acmocerini
Cerambycidae genera